Sandi Klavžar (born 5 February 1962) is a Slovenian mathematician working in the area of graph theory and its applications. He is a professor of mathematics at the University of Ljubljana.

Education
Klavžar received his Ph.D. from the University of Ljubljana in 1990, under the supervision of Wilfried Imrich and Tomaž Pisanski.

Research

Klavžar's research concerns graph products, metric graph theory, chemical graph theory, graph domination, and the Tower of Hanoi. Together with Wilfried Imrich and Richard Hammack, he is the author of the book Handbook of Product Graphs (CRC Press, 2011). Together with Andreas M. Hinz, Uroš Milutinović, and Ciril Petr, he is the author of the book The Tower of Hanoi – Myths and Maths (Springer, Basel, 2013).

Awards and honors

In 2007, Klavžar received the Zois award for exceptional contributions to science and mathematics.

References

External links
Home page at the University of Ljubljana

Living people
20th-century Slovenian mathematicians
Graph theorists
Mathematical chemistry
University of Ljubljana alumni
Academic staff of the University of Ljubljana
1962 births
21st-century Slovenian mathematicians